Gmina Dorohusk is a rural gmina (administrative district) in Chełm County, Lublin Voivodeship, in eastern Poland, on the border with Ukraine.

The gmina contains part of the protected area called Chełm Landscape Park.

Villages
Gmina Dorohusk contains the villages and settlements of Barbarówka, Berdyszcze, Brzeźno, Dobryłówka, Dorohusk, Dorohusk-Osada, Husynne, Kępa, Kolemczyce, Kroczyn, Ladeniska, Ludwinów, Majdan Skordiowski, Michałówka, Mościska, Myszkowiec, Okopy, Okopy-Kolonia, Olenówka, Ostrów, Pogranicze, Puszki, Rozkosz, Skordiów, Stefanów, Świerże, Teosin, Turka, Wólka Okopska, Zalasocze, Zamieście and Zanowinie.

Neighbouring gminas
Gmina Dorohusk is bordered by the gminas of Chełm, Dubienka, Kamień, Ruda-Huta and Żmudź. It also borders Ukraine.

References
Polish official population figures 2006

Dorohusk
Chełm County